The 2013–14 FC Krasnodar season was Krasnodars 3rd successive season in the Russian Premier League, the highest tier of football in Russia, in which they recorded their highest ever league finish, 5th, and qualified for the UEFA Europa League. Krasnodar also participated in the 2013–14 Russian Cup where they were runners-up to FC Rostov, losing on Penalties.

They started the season with Slavoljub Muslin in charge, however Muslin and the club agreed to mutually cancel their contract on 9 August 2013, with Aleh Konanaw being appointed as the new manager two days later.

Squad

Out on loan

Reserve squad
The following players are registered with the RFPL and are listed by club's website as reserve players. They are eligible to play for the first team.

Transfers

Summer

In:

Out:

Winter

In:

Out:

Friendlies

Competitions

Premier League

Matches

League table

Russian Cup

Squad statistics

Appearances and goals

|-
|colspan="14"|Players who left Krasnodar on loan during the season:

|-
|colspan="14"|Players who appeared for Krasnodar who left during the season:

|}

Top scorers

Disciplinary record

References

FC Krasnodar seasons
FC Krasnodar